Peasant Research and Promotion Center (Spanish: Centro de Investigación y Promoción del Campesinado; CIPCA) was founded in Bolivia by three Jesuits in 1970 to seek the most effective ways for farmers to pursue structural development and to integrate into the social fabric in the country.

History
CIPCA worked extensively with indigenous peasant organizations to facilitate their contribution to governmental and social change and to influence public policy.  CIPCA has helped obtain land titles for indigenous communities for over 400,000 hectares in the Beni Department.

References

External links

 
Jesuit development centres
Indigenous organisations in Bolivia
Organizations established in 1970
1970 establishments in Bolivia